Delvar-e Kuh Siah (also Romanized as Delvār-e Kūh Sīāh; also known as Dalvār-e Qūch Khvos and Delvār) is a village in Mahur Rural District, Mahvarmilani District, Mamasani County, Fars Province, Iran.

Population
At the 2006 census, its population was 58, and 12 families.

References 

Populated places in Mamasani County